REDIRECT Bajool, Queensland

Railway stations in Queensland
North Coast railway line, Queensland
Rockhampton Region